Southwest Reef Light is a historic lighthouse built in 1856 at the end of Southwest Reef in Atchafalaya Bay, Louisiana to replace lightships which had been stationed there for ten years. It served to guide vessels around the reef and into the main channel of the Atchafalaya River. It was discontinued in 1916 after a new, shorter and deeper, channel had been dredged across the reef, making it obsolete. Point Au Fer Reef Light took over its function.

It sat, rusting, in shallow water on the reef until 1987 when the town of Berwick, Louisiana paid to have it moved about  upriver to a park in the town on the Atchafalaya River. It was added to the National Register of Historic Places in 1991 as Southwest Reef Lighthouse.

The location given in the title bar and the National Register box is the current location in Berwick.  The location given in the upper box is its original location on the reef.

References

Lighthouses completed in 1856
Buildings and structures in St. Mary Parish, Louisiana
Lighthouses on the National Register of Historic Places in Louisiana
National Register of Historic Places in St. Mary Parish, Louisiana